Big Mountain Pass is a mountain pass in the Wasatch Mountains in Utah.

It is on the original route of the Mormon pioneers who crossed it in 1847 on their way to the Salt Lake Valley.

Mormon Trail
landforms of Morgan County, Utah
landforms of Salt Lake County, Utah
mountain passes of Utah
Wasatch Range